Rhabdammina is a genus in the family Rhabdamminidae of textulariid foraminifera. Rhabdammina species are vagile, inbenthos foraminiferans, usually found in deep sea regions with normal salinity.

References

External links 
 BioLib - Rhabdammina
 WoRMS taxon details: Rhabdammina Sars, 1869

Foraminifera genera
Extant Oligocene first appearances